The Kearney Yankees were a minor league baseball team that played in the Class D level Nebraska State League from 1956 to 1959. Hosting home games at Kearney Memorial Field, Kearney was a minor league affiliate of the New York Yankees.

History
Based in Kearney, Nebraska, the Kearney Yankees were a Class D level affiliate the New York Yankees for their four seasons of existence. The Yankees hosted minor league home games at Kearney Memorial Field.

The Nebraska State League folded after the 1959 season, along with 1959 league members Hastings Giants, Holdrege White Sox, Grand Island Athletics, Kearney Yankees, McCook Braves and North Platte Indians.

The ballpark
Kearney Memorial Field was constructed in 1946 and hosted the Kearney Yankees. It is still in use today by American Legion teams and is located at 3311 8th Avenue, Kearney, Nebraska. It has been home to American Legion baseball since 1946 and serves as the home for Kearney High School Baseball.

Year–by–year records

Notable alumni

 Jim Bouton (1959) MLB All–Star; Author Ball Four
 Horace Clarke (1958)
 Randy Gumpert (MGR, 1956–1958) MLB All-Star
 Deron Johnson (1956)
 Phil Linz (1957)
 Pete Mikkelsen (1958)
 Hal Reniff (1956)

References

External links
Baseball Reference

Baseball teams established in 1956
Defunct minor league baseball teams
Baseball teams disestablished in 1959
1956 establishments in Nebraska
1959 disestablishments in Nebraska
Defunct baseball teams in Nebraska
Nebraska State League teams
Kearney, Nebraska